Cladocolea is a genus of flowering plants belonging to the family Loranthaceae.

Its native range is Mexico to Southern Tropical America.

Species:

Cladocolea alternifolia 
Cladocolea andrieuxii 
Cladocolea clandestina 
Cladocolea coriacea 
Cladocolea coyucae 
Cladocolea cupulata 
Cladocolea dimorpha 
Cladocolea diversifolia 
Cladocolea elliptica 
Cladocolea glauca 
Cladocolea gracilis 
Cladocolea grahamii 
Cladocolea harlingii 
Cladocolea hintonii 
Cladocolea hondurensis 
Cladocolea inconspicua 
Cladocolea intermedia 
Cladocolea × kuijtii 
Cladocolea loniceroides 
Cladocolea mcvaughii 
Cladocolea micrantha 
Cladocolea microphylla 
Cladocolea molotensis 
Cladocolea oligantha 
Cladocolea pedicellata 
Cladocolea pringlei 
Cladocolea racemosa 
Cladocolea rostrifolia 
Cladocolea sandwithii 
Cladocolea spathiflora 
Cladocolea stricta

References

Loranthaceae
Loranthaceae genera